Největší Čech (The Greatest Czech) is the Czech spin-off of the BBC Greatest Britons show; a television poll of the populace to name the greatest Czech in history. The series was broadcast by the national public-service broadcaster, Czech Television. The presenter of the programme was Marek Eben, who was also nominated to be in the Top 100; however, since he was presenting the show he was not eligible to be included in the final list.

The counting and ranking of the nomination votes took place during January 2005; the top 100 were announced on 5 May; and the final rankings were announced on 10 June 2005. The first round was won by the fictional genius Jára Cimrman, but he was disqualified.

List of Greatest Czechs
 King Charles IV, Bohemian king (1346–1378) and Emperor (1355–1378), founder of Charles Bridge and Charles University – 68,713 votes
 Tomáš Garrigue Masaryk (1850–1937) – first Czechoslovak president (1918–1935) – 55,040 votes
 Václav Havel (1936–2011) – last Czechoslovak (1989–1992) and first Czech president (1993–2003)
 John Amos Comenius (1592–1670) – philosopher and pedagogue, "Teacher of Nations"
 Jan Žižka (1360–1424) – Hussite general, leader of Czech resistance to the Roman Empire and Catholic Church
 Jan Werich (1905–1980) – actor, playwright and author
 Jan Hus (1369–1415) – religious reformer
 Antonín Dvořák (1841–1904) – composer
 Karel Čapek (1890–1938) – writer, author of R.U.R.
 Božena Němcová – writer, author of The Grandmother
 Bedřich Smetana (1824–1884) – composer
 Emil Zátopek (1922–2000) – athlete, Olympic winner
 Karel Gott (1939–2019) – pop singer
 George of Poděbrady (1430–1471) – utraquist king
 František Palacký (1798–1876) – historian and politician
 Ottokar II of Bohemia (1233–1278) – king, known as "Iron and Gold King"
 Saint Wenceslaus (907–935) – duke (922–935) and patron saint of Bohemia
 Václav Klaus (1941–) – second president of the Czech Republic (2003–2013)
 Jaroslav Heyrovský (1890–1967) – chemist, Nobel prize laureate
 Saint Agnes of Bohemia (1211–1282) – princess and saint, founder of first Prague hospital
 Tomáš Baťa (1876–1932) – first republic businessman
 Edvard Beneš (1884–1948) – second Czechoslovak president (1935–1938, in exile 1940–1945, 1945–1948)
 Otto Wichterle (1913–1998) – chemist, inventor of contact lenses
 Jaroslav Seifert (1901–1986) – poet, Nobel Prize laureate
 Zdeněk Svěrák (1936–) – playwright, screenwriter, actor and "cimrmanologist"
 Emmy Destinn (1878–1930) – opera singer
 Jaromír Jágr (1972–) – ice hockey player
 Maria Theresa (1717–1780) – queen
 Karel Kryl (1944–1994) – dissident singer-songwriter
 Miloš Forman (1932–2018) – film director
 Vlasta Burian (1891–1962) – actor, "king of comedians"
 Roman Šebrle (1974–) – decathlete, Olympic winner
 Ivan Hlinka (1950–2004) – ice hockey player and coach
 Karel Havlíček Borovský (1821–1856) – journalist and writer
 Daniel Landa (1968–) – singer
 Milada Horáková (1901–1950) – victim of Nazism and later communism (hanged in 1950)
 Vladimír Menšík (1929–1988) – actor
 Jaroslav Hašek (1883–1923) – writer, author of The Good Soldier Švejk
 Alfons Mucha (1860–1939) – art nouveau painter
 Jan Evangelista Purkyně (1787–1869) – biologist and physician
 Pavel Nedvěd (1972–) – footballer (European footballer of the year 2003)
 Jan Janský (1873–1921) – neurologist and psychiatrist, discoverer of four blood types
 František Křižík (1847–1941) – inventor, engineer and industrialist
 Jan Železný (1966–) – Olympic athlete
 Jan Palach (1948–1969) – protester against Soviet invasion of 1968 (self-immolated)
 Věra Čáslavská (1942–2016) – Olympic athlete
 Leoš Janáček (1854–1928) – composer
 Alois Jirásek (1851–1930) – playwright and author
 Jaromír Nohavica (1953–) – musician
 Jan Masaryk (1886–1948) – Czechoslovak secretary of foreign affairs (1940–48)
 Bohumil Hrabal (1914–1997) – writer
 Jan Neruda (1834–1891) – writer
 Josef Jungmann (1773–1847) – linguist and translator
 Gregor Mendel (1822–1884) – geneticist, "father of genetics"
 Franz Kafka (1883–1924) – writer
 František Tomášek (1899–1992) – archbishop of Prague
 Saint Adalbert (956–997) – saint
 Josef Bican (1913–2001) – football player
 Josef Kajetán Tyl (1808–1856) – playwright
 Lucie Bílá (1966–) – pop singer
 Karel Hynek Mácha (1810–1836) – poet
 Saint Ludmila (860–921) – grandmother of the Czech patron St. Wenceslaus
 Boleslav Polívka (1949–) – actor
 Rudolf II, Holy Roman Emperor (1552–1612) – king
 Josef Dobrovský (1753–1829) – philologist
 Josef Lada (1753–1829) – painter
 Rudolf Hrušínský (1920–1994) – actor
 Wenceslaus II of Bohemia (1271–1305) – king
 Madeleine Albright (1937–) – politician, US secretary of state
 Aneta Langerová (1986–) – pop singer, Česko hledá SuperStar winner
 Ottokar I of Bohemia (1155–1230) – king, conqueror
 Ludvík Svoboda (1895–1975) – communist president
 Dominik Hašek (1965–) – ice hockey player
 John of Bohemia (1296–1346) – king, father of Charles IV
 Milan Baroš (1981–) – footballer
 Karel Jaromír Erben (1811–1870) –  poet
 Saint Zdislava (1200–1252) – saint
 Jaroslav Foglar (1907–1999) – writer
 Ladislav Smoljak (1931–2010) – actor and writer, actor and "cimrmanologist"
 Olga Havlová (1933–1996) – wife of Václav Havel, former Czechoslovak and Czech president
 Martina Navratilova (1956–) – tennis player
 Helena Růžičková (1936–2004) – actress
 Pavel Tigrid (1917–2003) – writer
 Elisabeth of Bohemia (1292–1330) – queen
 Milan Kundera (1929–) – writer
 Vladimír Remek (1948–) – cosmonaut and politician
 Boleslaus I, Duke of Bohemia (915-972?) – king
 Magdalena Dobromila Rettigová (1785–1845) – writer
 Mikoláš Aleš (1852–1913) – painter
 Emil Holub (1847–1907) – physician, traveler and writer
 František Fajtl (1912–2006) – fighter pilot in World War II
 Klement Gottwald (1896–1953) – first Communist president of Czechoslovakia
 Zdeněk Matějček (1922–2004)– pediatrician
 Jiří Voskovec (1905–1981)– actor
 Marta Kubišová (1942–) – singer and actress
 Jiřina Bohdalová (1931–) – actress
 Miloslav Šimek (1940–2004) – actor
 Sigmund Freud (1856–1939) – psychiatrist, teacher of Carl Gustav Jung
 Samo (600–658) – ruler of the so-called Samo's Realm
 Miloš Zeman (1944–) – third Czech president (since 2013)

The Greatest Villain
At the same time as the nominations, an Internet vote for the greatest villain of Czech history was held. The top ten were:

Klement Gottwald (1896–1953) – first Communist president of Czechoslovakia (1948–53)
Stanislav Gross (1969–2015) – 20th/21st-century politician, Czech Republic PM
Václav Klaus (1941–) – 20th/21st-century politician, president of Czech Republic
Vladimír Železný (1945–) – 20th/21st-century television businessman, founder of TV Nova, charged with an extensive tunnelling fraud
Miroslav Kalousek (1960–) – 20th/21st-century politician, leader of Christian Democratic party
Miroslav Grebeníček (1947–) – leader of Communist Party of Moravia and Bohemia
Viktor Kožený (1963–) – 20th/21st-century financial figure, fugitive financier, nicknamed "the pirate of Prague"
Milouš Jakeš (1922–2020) – 20th-century politician, General Secretary of Czechoslovak Communist Party before and during Velvet Revolution
Zdeněk Škromach (1956–) – former minister of work and social affairs
Gustáv Husák (1913–1991) – 20th-century politician, last Communist president of Czechoslovakia

Jára Cimrman
The first round of official voting for Greatest Czech was won by the fictional character Jára Cimrman created by Czech humorists Jiří Šebánek, Zdeněk Svěrák (who himself took the 25th place) and Ladislav Smoljak (79th). The fact that he is not a real person disqualified him from taking the title, as the rules stated that "it is only possible to vote for someone who was either born on, lived on, or in any way acted on the soil of Bohemia, Moravia or Czech Silesia."

References

External links
Official site

Greatest Nationals
Lists of Czech people
Historiography of the Czech Republic
Czech Television original programming
Czech television series based on British television series
2005 Czech television series debuts
2005 Czech television series endings